Imperial Brands plc (formerly Imperial Tobacco Group plc), is a British multinational tobacco company headquartered in Bristol, England. It is the world's fourth-largest international cigarette company measured by market share after Philip Morris International, British American Tobacco, and Japan Tobacco, and the world's largest producer of fine-cut tobacco and tobacco papers.

Imperial Brands produces over 320 billion cigarettes per year, has 51 factories worldwide, and its products are sold in over 160 countries. Its brands include Davidoff, West, Gauloises Blondes, Montecristo, Golden Virginia (the world's best-selling hand rolling tobacco), Drum (the world's second-largest-selling fine-cut tobacco), and Rizla (the world's best-selling rolling paper).

Imperial Brands is listed on the London Stock Exchange and is a constituent of the FTSE 100 Index. It had a market capitalization around £18.5 billion as of 4 June 2019, the 28th-largest of any company with a primary listing on the London Stock Exchange.

Imperial Tobacco Canada, the Canadian subsidiary of British American Tobacco, has no relationship to Imperial Brands.

History

1901 to 2000

The Imperial Tobacco Company was created in 1901, through the amalgamation of 13 British tobacco and cigarette companies: W.D. & H.O. Wills of Bristol (the leading manufacturer of tobacco products at that time), John Player & Sons of Nottingham, and 11 other independent family businesses, which were in competition with companies from the United States by the American Tobacco Company. First W. D. & H. O. Wills of Bristol merged with Stephen Mitchell & Son of Glasgow. Subsequently, other smaller companies including Lambert & Butler, William Clarke & Son, Franklyn Davey, Edwards Ringer & Bigg, Hignett Brothers, Hignett's Tobacco, Adkins & Sons, Richmond Cavendish, D&J MacDoland and F&J Smith joined in the amalgamation. In 1904, James & Finlay Bell Ltd merged with Stephen Mitchell & Son. The Company's first chairman was William Henry Wills of the Wills Company.

In 1902, the Imperial Tobacco Company and the American Tobacco Company agreed to form a joint venture: the British-American Tobacco Company Ltd. The parent companies agreed not to trade in each other's domestic territory and to assign trademarks, export businesses, and overseas subsidiaries to the joint venture. It built the Imperial Tobacco Company Building at Mullins, South Carolina, US between 1908, and 1913. It also established its own leaf-buying organisation in the United States through its building, the Imperial Tobacco Warehouse, in Durham, North Carolina, which is now owned, and has been renovated by, Measurement Incorporated. American Tobacco sold its share in 1911, but Imperial maintained an interest in British American Tobacco until 1980. In 1973, the Imperial Tobacco Company, having become increasingly diversified by acquisition of (amongst others) restaurant chains, food services and distribution businesses, changed its name to Imperial Group.

In 1910, Imperial Tobacco formed the Imperial Tobacco Company of India.

In 1985, the company acquired the Peoples Drug chain and all subsidiaries from A. C. Israel. In 1986, the company was acquired by the conglomerate Hanson Trust plc for £2.5 billion. Divestments during the period of ownership by Hanson included Courage Brewery to Elders, Golden Wonder to Dalgety, Finlays to Arunbhai J. Patel, the wholesaling arm of Sinclair & Collis to Palmer & Harvey, Imperial Hotels and Catering to Trust House Forte and Ross Frozen Foods to United Biscuits. This also led to a dispute over pension payments to employees, as seen in Imperial Group Pension Trust Ltd v Imperial Tobacco Ltd. In 1996, following a decision to concentrate on core tobacco activities, Hanson de-merged Imperial and it was listed as an independent company on the UK stock exchange.

2000 to present

In 2003, Imperial acquired the world's then fourth-largest tobacco company, Reemtsma Cigarettenfabriken GmbH of Germany: the deal added brands such as Davidoff, Peter Stuyvesant, and West to its portfolio. In 2007, Imperial Tobacco entered the United States tobacco market with its $1.9-billion acquisition of Commonwealth Brands Inc., then the fourth-largest tobacco company in the US. In February 2008, Imperial acquired the world's then fifth-largest tobacco company, Altadis, whose brands included Fortuna, Gauloises Blondes, and Gitanes. A number of factory closures were subsequently announced, including the long-running cigar factory in Bristol.

Following the Scottish Parliament's decision in January 2010, to ban the display of tobacco products in shops, as well as the availability of tobacco vending machines in public buildings with effect from autumn 2011, Imperial Tobacco attempted to challenge the change in the law on the grounds that regulations of the sale goods rested with the Houses of Parliament in Westminster. However, this case was dismissed on 30 September 2010 by Lord Bracadale in the Court of Session in Edinburgh.

In 2011, Altadis USA Inc. said it would add to its Fort Lauderdale, Florida, headquarters and move Commonwealth Brands Inc. employees from Bowling Green, Kentucky. The company's name changed to Commonwealth-Altadis Inc.

In 2013, Imperial opened a new global headquarters in Bristol.

In April 2014, Imperial announced the closure of its long-running Horizon factory in Nottingham. The factory closed in 2016, marking the end of cigarette production in England.

On 15 July 2014, Reynolds American agreed to buy Greensboro, North Carolina-based Lorillard Tobacco Company, for $27.4 billion. The deal also included the sale of the Kool, Winston, Salem, and blu eCigs brands to Imperial for $7.1 billion. In November 2014, Imperial said Commonwealth-Altadis and the Lorillard operations being acquired would be called ITG Brands LLC. The deal with Lorillard was completed on 12 June 2015, and as part of the deal, Greensboro became the location of the ITG headquarters. On 1 November 2018, ITG announced production would move from the former American Tobacco Company plant in Reidsville, North Carolina, built in 1892, and later expanded, to Greensboro by 2020. The plant made USA Gold, Sonoma, Montclair and Rave.

In February 2016, Imperial changed its name to "Imperial Brands" to distance itself from tobacco.

In 2018, a subsidiary, Imperial Brands Ventures, took a stake in Oxford Cannabinoid Technologies which is licensed by the UK government to develop cannabis-based medicines.

In November 2019, after searching for a new chairman since February, the company announced its senior independent director Thérèse Esperdy would take the role.

Archives
The principal companies involved in setting up Imperial Tobacco were W. D. & H. O. Wills Limited and John Player & Sons of Nottingham. Bristol Archives holds extensive records of W D & H O Wills and Imperial Tobacco (Ref. 38169). Nottinghamshire Archives hold the John Player and Sons collections (main ref. DD/PL). The archives at Liverpool Central Library hold records of the Ogden Branch (Ref. 380 OGD).

Products
The company's brands include:

Cigarettes

 All JTI 
 Ducados
 Dutch Masters (cigar)
 Backwoods Smokes
 blu (vape)
 Brandon's
 Capstan 
 Carlton
 Crowns
 Davidoff
 Embassy
 Escort 
 Excellence
 Fortuna
 Gauloises
 Gitanes
 Horizon
 John Player & Sons
 John Player Best
 Kool
 Lambert & Butler 
 Mark Fernyhough 
 Maverick
 Moon
 Parker & Simpson
 Peter Stuyvesant 
 Prima
 R1
 Regal
 Richmond
 Rodeo (in Macedonia)
 Route 66
 Royale
 Salem 
 Superkings
 USA Gold
 West
 Winston 
 Woodbine

Other

 Bali Shag 
 Drum 
 Golden Virginia 
 Players Gold Leaf 
 Champion Legendary 
 RizLa+ 
 Tally-Ho 
 Skruf Snus 
 Van Nelle 
 White Ox

Gallery

Operations
The Nottingham factory and the group's French factory in Nantes closed in 2016, with production moved to Eastern Europe.

Controversies 
In May 2022, The Times reported that the company had lobbied politicians in Scotland. Ivan McKee, the trade minister, was the highest-ranking government official who had met with the executives from Imperial Brands: he met them twice in 2018.

Notes

References

External links

 
 Imperial Tobacco (archived, 22 Jul 2008)
 

 
British companies established in 1901
Tobacco companies of the United Kingdom
1996 initial public offerings
Companies listed on the London Stock Exchange
Manufacturing companies established in 1901
Manufacturing companies based in Bristol
Multinational companies headquartered in England